MD&DI is a trade magazine for the medical device and diagnostic industry published by UBM Canon (Los Angeles). It includes peer-reviewed articles on specific technology issues and overviews of key business, industry, and regulatory topics. It was established in 1979. In 2009 it had a monthly print circulation of 48,040 but is now an online publication with a claimed circulation of 89,000. UBM Canon and the magazine has also sponsored the Medical Design and Manufacturing (MD&D) West Conference & Exposition (formerly the MD&DI West Conference & Expo), a medical device trade show, since 1978.

The magazine sponsored the Medical Design Excellence Awards and produces a list of 100 Notable People in the Medical Device Industry. The term "use error" was first used in May 1995 in an MD&DI guest editorial, The Issue Is 'Use,' Not 'User,' Error, by William Hyman.

References

External links
 

Business magazines published in the United States
Monthly magazines published in the United States
Medical equipment
Medical magazines
Magazines established in 1979
Magazines published in Los Angeles
Professional and trade magazines